Baliochila woodi is a butterfly in the family Lycaenidae. It is found in southern Malawi. Its habitat consists of the deeply shaded shrub layer of Newtonia gallery forests and riverine forests.

References

Butterflies described in 1943
Poritiinae
Endemic fauna of Malawi
Butterflies of Africa